The following is a list of notable people who were born in Kiel.

By era

Up to 1800
Peter III of Russia (1728–1762), emperor of Russia for six months in 1762. 
Johannes Nikolaus Tetens (1736–1807), German-Danish philosopher and statistician
Karl Leonhard Reinhold (1757–1823), an Austrian philosopher
Johan Ludwig Lund (1777–1867), Danish painter
Carl Loewe (1796–1869), composer, tenor singer and conductor
Gustav Adolf Michaelis (1798–1848), obstetrician and physician

1800 to 1850
August Howaldt (1809–1889), founder of Howaldtswerke
Friedrich Wilhelm Hermann Delffs (1812–1894), chemist
Otto Jahn (1813–1869) an archaeologist, philologist and writer on art and music.
Henri Lehmann (1814–1882), born French historical painter and portraitist
Adolf Michaelis (1835–1910), classical scholar, a professor of art history 
Robert Michaelis von Olshausen (1835–1915), obstetrician and gynecologist
August Mau (1840–1909), art historian and archaeologist
August Leskien (1840–1916), linguist, active in comparative linguistics 
Detlev von Liliencron (1844–1909), lyric poet and novelist
Hermann Graedener (1844–1929), composer, conductor and teacher

1850 to 1900
Ferdinand Tönnies (1855–1936), sociologist, philosopher
Kuno Francke (1855–1930), American educator and historian at Harvard University
Friedrich Ferdinand of Schleswig-Holstein-Sonderburg-Glücksburg (1855–1934), the fourth Duke of Schleswig-Holstein-Sonderburg-Glücksburg, became Duke of Schleswig-Holstein in 1931
Eduard Schwartz (1858–1940), classical philologist, wrote about the second Catilinarian conspiracy
Max Planck (1858–1947), theoretical physicist whose work on quantum mechanics won him the Nobel Prize in Physics in 1918
Johannes Weiss (1863–1914), Protestant theologian and Biblical exegete
Ernst Steinitz (1871–1928), mathematician, wrote on projective configuration 
Hans Geiger (1882–1945), physicist, co-invented the Geiger–Müller Counter in 1928
Hans Anton Aschenborn (1888–1931), animal painter of African wildlife
Paul Werner Wenneker (1890–1979), admiral and diplomat]
Carl Zuckmayer (1896–1977), writer and playwright
Bruno Diekmann (1897–1982), politician (SPD), Minister-President of Schleswig-Holstein 1949–1950
Karl Ristenpart (1900–1967), conductor
Ernst Busch (1900–1980), actor, singer, writer and collector of songs

1900 to 1910
Rudolf Hell (1901–2002), inventor, invented the Hellschreiber 
Kurt Otto Friedrichs (1901–1982), American mathematician, worked on partial differential equations
Ernst von Salomon (1902–1972), national-revolutionary writer and right-wing Freikorps member
Eduard Wald (1905–1978), Communist politician, trade unionist and member of the German Resistance against Nazism
Walther Müller (1905–1979), physicist, co-invented the Geiger–Müller Counter 1928
Heinrich Heesch (1906–1995), mathematician, worked on Group theory 
Helmut Lemke (1907–1990), Minister-President of Schleswig-Holstein 1963-1971 
Harro Schulze-Boysen (1909–1942), Resistance fighter
Herbert Schultze (1909–1987), U-boat commander
Klaus Wittkugel (1910–1985), commercial and poster artist in the East Germany
Lauritz Lauritzen (1910–1980), politician (SPD)

1910 to 1920
Erna Flegel (1911–2006), nurse in the Führerbunker 
Elisabeth von Janota-Bzowski (1912–2012), graphic artist known for her postage stamps designs
Karl Hass (1912–2004), German Lieutenant-Colonel in the SS
Carl Friedrich von Weizsäcker (1912–2007), physicist, philosopher
Hermann Michel (1912–1984?), SS officer
Otto Kretschmer (1912–1998), U-boat commander
Joachim Hamann (1913–1945), Baltic-German Nazi SS officer
Heinrich Wöhlk (1913–1991), optometrist, invented the plastic contact lens
Sigrid Hunke (1913–1999), author, made claims of Muslim influence over Western values
Heinrich Springer (1914–2007), Waffen-SS knights cross winner
Eberhard Blum (1919–2003), fourth head of the German Federal Intelligence Bureau

1920 to 1950
Shimon Wincelberg (1924–2004), American television writer and Broadway playwright
Judith Malina (1926–2015), American actress
Elyakim Haetzni (1926–2022), Israeli lawyer and member of the Knesset
Ulric Gustav Neisser (1928–2012), American psychologist and member of the US National Academy of Sciences
Oswalt Kolle (1928–2010), sex educator
Gerhard Stoltenberg (1928–2001), politician (CDU), minister and minister-president
Heiner Zieschang (1936–2004), mathematician, was a topologist
Heiko Braak (born 1937), anatomist, contributed to the neuropathology of Alzheimer's disease and Parkinson's disease
Ilse Gramatzki (born 1939), operatic mezzo-soprano and contralto
Eric Braeden (born 1941), German-American actor
Dieter Laser (1942–2020), actor
Marina Lewycka (born 1946), British novelist of Ukrainian origin

Since 1950
Manfred Stahnke (born 1951), composer and musicologist
 Ewald Schnug (born 1954), agricultural researcher, professor, Honorary-President of the International Scientific Center for Fertilizers
Duchess Donata of Mecklenburg (born 1956), senior remaining member of the House of Mecklenburg-Schwerin
Axel Milberg (born 1956), actor
Anke Ehlers (born 1957), psychologist, expert in post traumatic stress disorder 
Andreas Brandstätter (1959–2006), diplomat
Ilme Schlichting (born 1960), biophysicist studied biomolecules using protein crystallography
Thilo Martinho (born 1960), musician, singer, guitarist and songwriter
Michael F. Feldkamp (born 1962), historian and journalist
Feridun Zaimoğlu (born 1964), German author and playwright
Detlev Bork (born 1967), classical and flamenco guitarist
Tomma Abts (born 1967), painter and Turner Prize winner
Fritz Felgentreu (born 1968), politician (SPD)
Cora E. (born 1968), hip-hop artist
Daniel Günther (born 1973), politician (CDU)
Gesche Joost (born 1974), design researcher, e.g. on human-computer interaction 
Kim Dotcom (born 1974), German-Finnish Internet entrepreneur and political activist
Alexander Bommes (born 1976), handball player and journalist
Ulrich Schnauss (born 1977), electronic musician and producer
Lasse Rempe-Gillen (born 1978), mathematician
Caspar Frantz (born 1980), classical pianist

Athletes
George Eyser (1870–1919) German-American gymnast
Alfred Brinckmann (1891–1967), chess International Master and author
Heinrich Dahlinger (1922–2008), field handball player
Manfred Rulffs (1935–2007), rower
Eckart Johannes Wagner (1938–2002), sailor
Egon Müller (born 1948), motorcycle speedway rider
Andreas Köpke (born 1962), footballer
Heike Henkel (born 1964), high jumper, 1992 Olympic winner
Francisco Copado (born 1974), footballer
Britta Carlson (born 1978), footballer
Sidney Sam (born 1988), footballer

References

Kiel